Abanino is a rural locality (a village) in Rostilovskoye Rural Settlement of Gryazovetsky District, Vologda Oblast, Russia. The population was 14 as of 2002.

Geography 
Abanino is located 20 km south of Gryazovets (the district's administrative centre) by road. Sopelkino is the nearest rural locality.

References 

Rural localities in Gryazovetsky District